Pseudospirobolellus avernus, is a species of pill millipede in the family Pseudospirobolellidae. It is found in Comoros, Java, Samoa, Sulawesi, Vietnam, and South Asia. It is introduced to Caribbean Islands.

References

Spirobolida
Millipedes of Asia
Animals described in 1876